Harrisonburg Transit is the municipally-owned public transportation system for the City of Harrisonburg in the Shenandoah Valley region of Virginia.  The system is operated by the Harrisonburg Department of Public Transportation (HDPT).  Funding for the bus service is provided by the Virginia Department of Transportation, U.S. Department of Transportation, James Madison University, and the City of Harrisonburg.

Services 
Much of the scheduled bus service is focused around JMU at the Godwin Transit Center with other main transfer points for city routes being on East Market Street at the Cloverleaf Shopping Center and the transfer hub at East Gay Street. HDPT also provides regular daily school transportation, using a fleet of approximately 50 school buses, as well as for field trips and sporting events. Paratransit service is offered for persons who have disabilities as prescribed under the Americans with Disabilities Act.

Harrisonburg Transit's buses are mostly Gillig Low Floor buses with one Gillig Phantom bus. As of July 2016, the fleet consists of 39 fixed route transit buses with model years ranging from 2003 to 2015 (not including paratransit, school, or activity buses).

Year round bus routes 
Route 1 – East Market Street
Route 2 – East Market Street & Northeast Neighborhoods
Route 3 – South High & North Main
Route 4 – South Main Street
Route 5 – Virginia Ave
Route 6 – Port Republic Road & Reservoir Street

Routes operating only when JMU is in session
Shopper – JMU to Walmart/Valley Mall
Inner Campus Shuttle (ICS) – JMU Stops Only
Route 7 – JMU to South View/Fox Hill/Squire Hill
Route 8 – JMU to Sunchase/Miller Hall
Route 9 – JMU to Stone Gate/Memorial Hall
Route 10 – JMU to Pheasant Run/The Mill
Route 11 – JMU to Montpelier Hall
Route 12 – JMU to Overlook/South View/Fox Hill/Squire Hill
Route 13 – JMU to South View/Fox Hill/Squire Hill/Miller Hall
Route 14 – JMU to Port Republic to Memorial Hall
Route 15 – JMU to Charleston Townes/Copper Beech/Campus View
Route 16 – JMU to North 38
Route 17 – JMU to Aspen Heights
Route 18 – JMU  to Hunters Ridge/The Harrison
Night Campus Shuttle (NCS) – JMU Stops Only
Route 31 – JMU to Pheasant Run/Downtown Harrisonburg/North 38/Walmart
Route 32 – JMU to Walmart/Sunchase/Charleston Townes/Valley Mall/Copper Beech
Route 33 – JMU to Port Republic
Route 35 – JMU to Port Republic/Sunchase/Stone Gate
Route 36 – JMU to Sunchase/Stone Gate/South View/Fox Hill/Squire Hill
Route 37 – JMU to Port Republic/South Main
Route 38 – JMU to South Main/Sunchase/Charleston Townes/Copper Beech/Campus View
Route 39 – JMU to Evelyn Byrd Avenue/Copper Beech/Stone Gate/South View/Fox Hill/Squire Hill
Route 40 – JMU to North 38/Charleston Townes/Stone Gate/South View/Fox Hill/Squire Hill
Sunday Shuttle 1 – JMU to South Main/Port Republic
Sunday Shuttle 2 – JMU to Evelyn Byrd Avenue/Copper Beech/Campus View/Cloverleaf/North 38

References

External links 

 Harrisonburg Department of Public Transportation
Bus transportation in Virginia
Transportation in Harrisonburg, Virginia
James Madison University
Transit agencies in Virginia
1976 establishments in Virginia
Government agencies established in 1976